The Barracuda Championship is a professional golf tournament on the PGA Tour in California. Founded in 1999, it is an alternate event played annually in August. Previously played at Montrêux Golf and Country Club outside Reno, Nevada, the tournament moved to Tahoe Mountain Club's Old Greenwood course, located in nearby Truckee, California, in 2020.

Until 2010, the tournament was played in August, the same week as the WGC-Bridgestone Invitational. For its first three years, it had a full field of 156 players, while the World Golf Championship event had a field of about 40. When the WGC event expanded to about 80 players in 2002, the field for the Reno–Tahoe Open was reduced to 132 players. With the launch of the FedEx Cup in 2007, the tournament and the WGC event were moved from late to early August. In 2010 the Reno–Tahoe Open was played several weeks earlier, opposite the Open Championship in mid-July.  This lasted only one year, as it returned to early August in 2011, opposite the WGC-Bridgestone.

The purse in 2020 was $3.5 million, with a winner's share of $630,000. The Reno–Tahoe Open gained its first title sponsor for the 2008 event, the Legends at Sparks Marina. After two years the name was returned to "Reno–Tahoe Open" in 2010. Barracuda Networks became the title sponsor in 2014.

The Reno–Tahoe Open is an alternate event, which means the winner does not earn a Masters Tournament invitation. The winner still earns 24 OWGR points, 300 FedEx Cup points, a two-year tour exemption, and entry to the PGA Championship.

After flooding in West Virginia cancelled the Greenbrier Classic in 2016, the Reno–Tahoe Open was given the honor of awarding entry to the Open Championship to the leading non-exempt player.

In August 2021, it was announced that from 2022 onward, the event would become a co-sanctioned event with the European Tour.

Highlights
1999: Notah Begay III wins the inaugural event.
2006: Yūsaku Miyazato becomes only the second player in PGA tour history to score two holes-in-one in the same round.
2011: Scott Piercy wins in the final year as a stroke play event. 
2016: Greg Chalmers eagles the 18th hole after Gary Woodland made bogey, earning entry into the Open Championship. Chalmers was making his 386th PGA Tour start, the most among active golfers without a win, and only had veteran member status on the PGA Tour.
2017: In his 290th PGA Tour start, Chris Stroud won after planning to retire at season's end.
2019: In just his sixth start as a professional, Collin Morikawa birdies the last three holes to win.

Modified Stableford
Beginning in 2012, the tournament has used the Modified Stableford scoring system, last used in a PGA Tour event at the 2006 International in Colorado.

This points scale encourages aggressive play, since the reward for scoring under par is higher than the penalty for scoring over par.

Winners

Note: Green highlight indicates scoring records.
Sources:

Notes

References

External links

Coverage on the PGA Tour's official site
Coverage on the European Tour's official site
Montrêux Golf and Country Club
Montreux Golf & Country Club at Nicklaus.com

PGA Tour events
European Tour events
Golf in Nevada
Golf in California
Sports in Reno, Nevada
Recurring sporting events established in 1999
1999 establishments in Nevada